Metrophanes III of Byzantium (1520 – 9 August 1580) was Ecumenical Patriarch of Constantinople two times, from 1565 to 1572 and from 1579 to 1580.

Life
Metrophanes was born in 1520 to a Bulgarian merchant father in the village of Agia Paraskevi (now part of Istanbul), from where he took the sobriquet Byzantios ("of Byzantium"). His original name is variously given as Manuel or George.

In 1546 he was appointed Metropolitan of Caesarea by his personal friend Patriarch Dionysius II, who sent him to Venice mainly to raise funds, but Metrophanes went also to Rome and met the Pope. In 1548 this news caused a great concern in a part of the Greek population of Constantinople, with riots and an attempt to murder Dionysius who was considered as guilty as Metrophanes. Dionysius was on the point of being deposed, but no actions was taken against him because he enjoyed the support of Suleiman the Magnificent. Metrophanes was deposed from his See of Caesarea, but in 1551 he was forgiven and he went to live in the Monastery of the Holy Trinity in the island of Chalki where he took care and enlarged the library.

He was elected Patriarch the first time in January or February 1565 supported by the rich and influential Michael Cantacuzene. He reigned for seven years, and tried to improve the finances of the Patriarchate also through a trip in Moldavia. He was an open-minded man of letters, and well disposed towards the Westerners, both Catholic and Protestant. In 1568, Metrophanes issued a strong condemnation in an encyclical letter concerning mistreatment of Jews in Crete, stating: "Injustice ... regardless to whomever acted upon or performed against, is still injustice. The unjust person is never relieved of the responsibility of these acts under the pretext that the injustice is done against a heterodox and not to a believer. As our Lord Jesus Christ in the Gospels said do not oppress or accuse anyone falsely; do not make any distinction or give room to the believers to injure those of another belief."

He was deposed on 4 May 1572 when Michael Cantacuzene transferred his support to the young and brilliant Jeremias II Tranos. After his deposition, to grant him a financial revenue, he was appointed bishop eis zoarkeian (i.e. without pastoral obligations) of Larissa and Chios, and he returned to live in the Monastery of the Holy Trinity in the island of Chalki, near the capital.

After his attempts to return to the throne, in 1573 he was exiled to Mount Athos. Six years later, after the execution of Michael Cantacuzene and the murder of the Great Vizier Mehmed, Jeremias lost his supporters and Metrophanes was successfully restored on the throne on 25 November 1579. He died a few months later, on 9 August 1580, and was buried in the Pammakaristos Church, at the time the patriarchal cathedral.

Notes

Sources
 

|-

1520 births
1580 deaths
Bulgarian Orthodox bishops
16th-century Bulgarian people
16th-century Ecumenical Patriarchs of Constantinople
Bulgarians from Eastern Thrace
Bishops of Larissa
Clergy from Istanbul
People from Beyoğlu